C. c. elegans may refer to:
 Camponotus claripes elegans, an ant subspecies in the genus Camponotus
 Cyrestis camillus elegans, a butterfly subspecies found in Madagascar

See also 
 C. elegans (disambiguation)